Olbothrepta is a genus of moth in the family Lecithoceridae.

Species
 Olbothrepta hydrosema (Meyrick, 1916)

Former species
 Olbothrepta corythista (Meyrick, 1918)
 Olbothrepta sphaeristis (Meyrick, 1908)

References

Natural History Museum Lepidoptera genus database

Lecithoceridae